Romain Faivre (born 14 July 1998) is a French professional footballer who plays as a midfielder for Ligue 1 club Lorient, on loan from Lyon.

Club career

Monaco
On 12 February 2018, Faivre signed his first professional contract with Monaco. He made his professional debut in a 1–0 Coupe de la Ligue win over Lorient on 19 December 2018.

Brest
On 30 June 2020, Faivre joined Brest in a deal worth €650,000. He made his debut for the club in a 4–0 league loss to Nîmes on 23 August.

Lyon
On 31 January 2022, Faivre joined fellow Ligue 1 side Lyon on a contract until June 2026. The transfer fee paid to Brest was a reported €15 million, with a potential €2 million in bonuses. The Breton side also secured a 15% sell-on clause in the deal. On 4 March 2022, Faivre scored his first two goals for Lyon, the first brace of his career, in a 4–1 away win over Lorient.

Lorient (loan) 
On 28 January 2023, Faivre joined Lorient on loan for the remainder of the 2022–23 season.

Personal life
Born in France, Faivre is of Algerian descent through his mother.

Career statistics

Club

References

External links

AS Monaco Profile

1998 births
Living people
People from Asnières-sur-Seine
Association football midfielders
French footballers
France under-21 international footballers
France youth international footballers
French sportspeople of Algerian descent
AS Monaco FC players
Stade Brestois 29 players
Olympique Lyonnais players
FC Lorient players
Ligue 1 players
Championnat National 2 players
Championnat National 3 players
Footballers from Hauts-de-Seine